Marty Gurr (born 11 September 1958) is a former professional rugby league footballer who played in the 1970s and 1980s. He played in the New South Wales Rugby League (NSWRL) competition.

Playing career
Gurr was selected to represent the New South Wales Blues as a fullback for games II and III of the 1983 State of Origin series.

Gurr played  in Leeds' 14–15 defeat by St. Helens in the 1987–88 John Player Special Trophy Final during the 1987–88 season at Central Park, Wigan on Saturday 9 January 1988.

Post playing
After retiring from the game, Gurr moved into coaching, management and recruitment roles with Manly and then Souths.

References

1958 births
Living people
Australian rugby league players
Leeds Rhinos players
Manly Warringah Sea Eagles players
New South Wales Rugby League State of Origin players
Rugby league fullbacks
Rugby league players from Newcastle, New South Wales
South Sydney Rabbitohs players
Sydney Roosters players